Barbarea intermedia (common name medium-flowered winter-cress) is a species of flowering plant in the family Brassicaceae. It is native to northern Africa and many parts of Europe, and naturalized in some parts of Asia, Africa and Europe.

References

intermedia
Flora of Europe
Flora of Nepal